Social Liberal Party and similar titles may refer to:

 The Social Liberals (Austria)
 Sociaal-Liberale Partij, Belgium
 Social Liberal Party (Brazil)
 Croatian Social Liberal Party
 Danish Social Liberal Party
 New Union (Social Liberals), Lithuania
 Social Liberal Party (Maldives)
 Social Liberal Party (Moldova)
 Social Liberal and Democratic Party, Mozambique
 Social Liberal Party (The Netherlands)
 Social Liberal Party (São Tomé and Príncipe) 
 Social Liberal Party of Sandžak, Serbia
 Social Liberal Party (Tunisia)

See also
 Liberal Party
 Liberalism by country
 Social-liberal coalition
 Social liberalism

Social liberal parties